St. Elizabeth High School may refer to:

St. Elizabeth High School (Oakland, California) — Oakland, California
St. Elizabeth High School (Wilmington, Delaware) — Wilmington, Delaware

St. Elizabeth Catholic High School
St. Elizabeth Secondary School — Karen, Nairobi
St. Elizabeth Secondary School, Sibu, Sarawak